Antonio Danani (born 22 June 1938) is a Swiss former footballer who played in the 1950s and 1960s. He played as striker.

Danani first played FC Moutier in the 1 Liga, the third tier of Swiss football. He then joined FC Basel's first team during their 1960–61 season under trainer Jenö Vincze. After playing in four test games, Danani played his domestic league debut for his new club in the home game at the Landhof on 21 August 1960 as Basel were defeated 1–5 by Young Fellows Zürich. He scored his first goal for his club on 23 October 1960. But his goal did not save Basel from being defeated 1–4 by Winterthur.

In his one season with Basel, Danani played in a total of 15 games for Basel scoring just that one goal. 10 of these games were in the Nationalliga A, one in the Swiss Cup and four were friendly games.

Following his time with Basel Danani returned to his club of origin FC Moutier, who in the meantime, had won promotion to the Nationalliga B in the 1961–62 season.

References

Sources
 Die ersten 125 Jahre. Publisher: Josef Zindel im Friedrich Reinhardt Verlag, Basel. 
 Verein "Basler Fussballarchiv" Homepage

FC Basel players
Swiss men's footballers
Association football forwards
1938 births
Living people